2014 Apatin Open is a darts tournament, which took place in Apatin, Serbia in 2014.

Results

References

Apatin Open darts
Apatin Open darts
Darts in Serbia
Apatin Open darts